Electoral district of Dandenong North was an electoral district of the Legislative Assembly in the Australian state of Victoria.

Members for Dandenong North

Election results

References

Former electoral districts of Victoria (Australia)
1985 establishments in Australia
2002 disestablishments in Australia